Duncan Bell may refer to: 
Duncan Bell (actor) (born 1955), Scottish actor
Duncan Bell (rugby union) (born 1974), English rugby union player
Duncan Bell (historian), English lecturer and author